Jeff White House is a historic home located near Marshall, Madison County, North Carolina.  It is dated to the late-19th century, and is a two-story, three-bay, "T"-shaped frame farmhouse.  It features a two-story gable-roof front porch, with notable applied wooden ornament and rich, lacelike ornamentation.

It was listed on the National Register of Historic Places in 1975.

References

Houses on the National Register of Historic Places in North Carolina
Houses in Madison County, North Carolina
National Register of Historic Places in Madison County, North Carolina